The Marshes Fire was a 2016 wildfire that burned just north of the Don Pedro Reservoir in Tuolumne County, California. The fire, which started on September 26, burned  of land from before being contained on October 4. Approximately 30 homes were evacuated and two minor injuries were reported.

Effects
Over a dozen homes were evacuated in the Moccasin Ranch Estates subdivision during the first hours of the fire. Pacific Gas and Electric also reported a number of power outages due to the fire. The fire briefly threatened the Hetch Hetchy Regional Water System headquarters, but normal water operations continued throughout the fire.

Cause
On September 28, officials from Cal Fire released a statement saying that the fire had been started by a vehicle parked in dry grass. Investigators determined that the driver, who had been traveling along Marshes Flat Road, pulled over to take a break and the fire started shortly thereafter.

References

2016 California wildfires
Wildfires in Tuolumne County, California
Stanislaus National Forest